Ginkgo is a genus of non-flowering seed plants. The scientific name is also used as the English name. The order to which it belongs, Ginkgoales, first appeared in the Permian, 270 million years ago, and Ginkgo is now the only living genus within the order. The rate of evolution within the genus has been slow, and almost all its species had become extinct by the end of the Pliocene. The sole surviving species, Ginkgo biloba is only found in the wild in China, but is cultivated around the world. The relationships between ginkgos and other groups of plants are not fully resolved.

Prehistory 
The ginkgo (Ginkgo biloba) is a living fossil, with fossils similar to the modern plant dating back to the Permian, 270 million years ago. The closest living relatives of the clade are the cycads, which share with the extant G. biloba the characteristic of motile sperm. The ginkgo and cycad lineages are thought to have an extremely ancient divergence dating to the early Carboniferous. Fossils attributable to the genus Ginkgo with reproductive organs similar to the modern species first appeared in the Middle Jurassic, and the genus diversified and spread throughout Laurasia during the Jurassic and Early Cretaceous. It declined in diversity as the Cretaceous progressed with the extinction of species such as Ginkgo huolinhensis, and by the Palaeocene, only a few Ginkgo species, Ginkgo cranei and Ginkgo adiantoides, remained in the Northern Hemisphere, while a markedly different (and poorly documented) form persisted in the Southern Hemisphere.  At the end of the Pliocene, Ginkgo fossils disappeared from the fossil record everywhere except in a small area of central China, where the modern species survived. It is doubtful whether the Northern Hemisphere fossil species of Ginkgo can be reliably distinguished. Given the slow pace of evolution and morphological similarity between members of the genus, there may have been only one or two species existing in the Northern Hemisphere through the entirety of the Cenozoic: present-day G. biloba (including G. adiantoides) and G. gardneri from the Palaeocene of Scotland.

At least morphologically, G. gardneri and the Southern Hemisphere species are the only known post-Jurassic taxa that can be unequivocally recognised. The remainder may have been ecotypes or subspecies. The implications would be that G. biloba had occurred over an extremely wide range, had remarkable genetic flexibility and, though evolving genetically, never showed much speciation. While it may seem improbable that a species may exist as a contiguous entity for many millions of years, many of the ginkgo's life-history parameters fit. These are: extreme longevity; slow reproduction rate; (in Cenozoic and later times) a wide, apparently contiguous, but steadily contracting distribution coupled with, as far as can be demonstrated from the fossil record, extreme ecological conservatism (restriction to disturbed streamside environments).

Modern-day G. biloba grows best in well-watered and drained environments, and the extremely similar fossil Ginkgo favoured similar environments. The sediment records at the majority of fossil Ginkgo localities indicate it grew primarily in disturbed environments along streams and levees. Ginkgo therefore presents an "ecological paradox" because, while it possesses some favourable traits for living in disturbed environments (clonal reproduction), many of its other life-history traits (slow growth, large seed size, late reproductive maturity) are the opposite of those exhibited by modern plants that thrive in disturbed settings.

Given the slow rate of evolution of the genus, it is possible that Ginkgo represents a pre-angiosperm strategy for survival in disturbed streamside environments. Ginkgo evolved in an era before flowering plants, when ferns, cycads, and cycadeoids dominated disturbed streamside environments, forming a low, open, shrubby canopy. The large seeds of Ginkgo and its habit of "bolting"—growing to a height of  before elongating its side branches—may be adaptations to such an environment. Diversity in the genus Ginkgo dropped through the Cretaceous (along with that of ferns, cycads, and cycadeoids) at the same time the flowering plants were on the rise, which supports the notion that flowering plants, with their better adaptations to disturbance, displaced Ginkgo and its associates over time.

Trichopitys heteromorpha from the earliest Permian of France, is one of the earliest fossils ascribed to the Ginkgophyta. It had multiple-forked non-laminar leaves with cylindrical, thread-like ultimate divisions. Sphenobaiera (early Permian-Cretaceous) had wedge-shaped leaves divided into narrow dichotomously-veined lobes, lacking distinct petioles (leaf stalks). Baiera (Triassic-Jurassic) had similar multiple-lobed leaves but with petioles.

Phylogeny
, molecular phylogenetic studies have produced at least six different placements of Ginkgo relative to cycads, conifers, gnetophytes and angiosperms. The two most common are that Ginkgo is a sister to a clade composed of conifers and gnetophytes and that Ginkgo and cycads form a clade within the gymnosperms. A 2013 study examined the reasons for the discrepant results and concluded that the best support was for the monophyly of Ginkgo and cycads.

Etymology

Despite its spelling, which is due to a complicated etymology including a transcription error, "ginkgo" is usually pronounced , which has given rise to the common alternative spelling "gingko". The spelling pronunciation  is also documented in some dictionaries.

Engelbert Kaempfer first introduced the spelling ginkgo in his book Amoenitatum Exoticarum. It is considered that he may have misspelled "Ginkyo" as "Ginkgo". This misspelling was included by Carl Linnaeus in his book Mantissa plantarum II and has become the name of the tree's genus.

References

Citations

Sources

External links

 
Extant Permian first appearances
Gymnosperm genera
Permian plants
Prehistoric gymnosperm genera
Taxa named by Carl Linnaeus